Casio Databank (often styled as CASIO DATA BANK) is a series of digital watches and electronic personal organizers manufactured by Casio. The watches allow data storage for names and telephone numbers, memos, and in late editions, email addresses; in addition to usually providing a calculator as well as the standard features of a digital watch. While, the personal organizers allowed storage of names, telephones and fax numbers, memos and includes a 'secret' storage area for memos which required a password to access.

History

C-80 is the first calculator watch to be ever produced. The Databank CD-40 and CD-401 are the first Databank watches, debuting in 1983. It is one of the first digital watches developed in the 1980s that allows the user to store information, following a Pulsar model released in 1982.

Over the years, watches in the Data Bank line gained a variety of features some of which were world firsts, starting with schedule and world time (introduced on the DBC-62), phone dialler (DBA-80/800 and DBA-100/900), Electroluminescent backlight, radium keypads, touch screen (VDB-1000 and VDB-200), voice recording capabilities (DBV-30/300 and DBC-V50/150) and atomic time reception functions (DBC-W150, FKT-2000 and FKT-300) in addition to data storage capabilities. Collaboration models of the Data Bank line were also made.

Future 

With the advent of smartphones and smart watches, the data bank watches like calculator watches lost their popularity and are now mostly a fashion statement. Today, Casio still sells data bank models with basic data bank functions. Data bank models having unique features are highly sought after by watch collectors.
  
, Casio sells the following models of the data bank; the DBC-611 and the DBC-32, which provide data storage, calculation and schedule capabilities, the DB-380 and the DB-36/360 which provide data storage capabilities. All models allow for a selection of multiple languages.

See also
Smartwatch
Calculator watch

References

External links
Casio Data Bank Catalog
Museum of Casio Data Bank Watches

Data Bank
Computer-related introductions in 1983